Oberes Feldatal is a former Verwaltungsgemeinschaft in the district Wartburgkreis in Thuringia, Germany. The seat of the Verwaltungsgemeinschaft was in Kaltennordheim. It was disbanded on 31 December 2013.

The Verwaltungsgemeinschaft Oberes Feldatal consisted of the following municipalities:

 Andenhausen 
 Diedorf 
 Empfertshausen 
 Fischbach/Rhön 
 Kaltenlengsfeld 
 Kaltennordheim 
 Klings

Former Verwaltungsgemeinschaften in Thuringia